The 2018–19 Maltese Futsal Premier League is the 9th season of the Maltese Gatorade League, the top Maltese league for futsal clubs, since its establishment in 2011. It is also 20th season of the futsal championship in Malta, since the beginning of organized futsal in the country in 1999.

It is a transitory season in the handover between the Futsal Malta Association and the Malta Football Association with regards to operation of the league.

Teams

Teams as of August 2018:

Transfers

References

Malta
Futsal
Seasons in Maltese football competitions